Takaoka (written: 高岡 lit. "tall mount", "high hill", "knoll expensive", or 鷹岡 lit. "hawk ridge", "hawk hill") may refer to:

Places
 Takaoka, Toyama, a city in Toyama Prefecture, Japan
 Takaoka, Miyazaki  (高岡町, Takaoka-chō), a former town in Higashimorokata District, Miyazaki, Japan
 Takaoka Dam, a dam in Miyazaki Prefecture, Japan
 Takaoka District, Kōchi,  a district in Kōchi, Japan
 Takaoka Domain (高岡藩, Takaoka han), a Japanese domain of the Edo period, in modern-day Chiba Prefecture, Japan
 Takaoka Freight Terminal, a railway freight terminal in Takaoka, Toyama, Japan
 Takaoka Station (disambiguation)
 Takaoka University of Law, Takaoka, Toyama, Japan

People
 Takaoka clan (高岡氏, Takaoka-shi), a historical Japanese clan
, Japanese singer-songwriter
, Japanese geisha
, founder of Takaoka clan in Izumo Province, Japan
, Japanese former actor
, Japanese long-distance runner
, Japanese actress
 Michio Takaoka, the Japanese discoverer of resveratrol in 1939

Fictional characters
, a character in the manga/anime series Assassination Classroom

See also
 Albuquerque & Takaoka, a Brazilian architecture, civil engineering and real estate development company
 Zhu–Takaoka string matching algorithm, a variant of the Boyer–Moore string search algorithm

Japanese-language surnames